Roy Anthony Cutaran Bennett (April 6, 1913, Bayombong, Cagayan Valley, Philippines – November 11, 1990, Rosemead, California, USA) was the outspoken editor of the Manila Bulletin before and during the Japanese invasion of the Philippines.

Imprisonment
For 13 months prior to liberation of the Philippines by combined American and Filipino forces in 1945, Bennett was imprisoned and tortured in Santo Tomas Internment Camp and Fort Santiago by the Japanese for his writings opposing the military expansion of the Japanese Empire. His refusal to cooperate with the Japanese occupiers, who desired to use the newspapers as a propaganda organ under their censorship, became symbolic motivation to Filipinos to intensify their resistance.

Family background
Bennett was one of four children of Roy DeWitt Bennett (1884–1968) and Josefa Camaguian Cutaran Bennett (1884–1949). Roy Anthony Cutaran Bennett's sister Helen Cutaran Bennett became Foreign Secretary for Philippine President Elpidio Quirino.

Notes

1913 births
1990 deaths
Filipino newspaper editors
Filipino torture victims
People from Nueva Vizcaya
People from Manila
People from Rosemead, California
Manila Bulletin people
Filipino emigrants to the United States